Fox Theatres was a large chain of movie theaters in the United States dating from the 1920s either built by Fox Film studio owner William Fox, or subsequently merged in 1929 by Fox with the West Coast Theatres chain, to form the Fox West Coast Theatres chain. Fox West Coast went into bankruptcy and was sold to The National Theatres Corporation, led by Charles Skouras, on November 20, 1933, for $17,000,000.00.  Eugene V. Klein later became CEO of National, and turned it into the conglomerate National General. Mann Theatres bought National General's theatres in 1973.

This chain should not be confused with the Reading, Pennsylvania-based Fox Theaters, founded by Richard Allen "Dick" Fox in 1957 and primarily based on the East Coast.

Architectural styles
Many of these grand "movie palaces" were built with a mishmash of architectural styles drawn from Asian, Indian, Persian, and Moorish influences.

Restorations 
Fox theaters surviving today share almost identical histories of decline and fall into disrepair as demographics and movie-going habits changed in the post-World War II years.  As many were located in urban centers, there have been subsequent campaigns to save, restore and preserve the architectural extravaganzas for other uses, especially the performing arts. The largest of the Fox Theatres is the Detroit Fox Theatre, which was fully restored in 1988 and is used as a performing arts center.

Other Fox theatres which have been restored and adapted for drama and music include those in Saint Louis; also Tucson, Arizona, which reopened in January 2006 after being closed for thirty-two years; Hutchinson, Kansas, reopened in 1999; Oakland, California, reopened in February 2009; Aurora, Colorado reopened in 1986, and Fullerton, California, where a non-profit community project is restoring the theatre. The Fox theatres in Visalia, California, reopened in 1999, and Atlanta were shuttered for some time before restoration began.

The Fox Theatre in Joplin, Missouri, built in 1930, has been adapted for use as the Central Christian Church.

Bankruptcy
The financial pressures of the Great Depression compelled William Fox (producer) to declare bankruptcy. Initiated circa 1929, bankruptcy receivership court proceedings spanned "over a period of twenty-five or more years." The matter culminated in a final suit brought in 1954 by the trustees to vacate the "corrupt" November 17, 1933, settlement order. The trustees alleged a widespread "conspiracy to milk Fox Theatres Corporation of assets worth many millions of dollars, in derogation of the rights of its creditors and stockholders." The complaint named the issuing judge, indicted on unrelated federal charges in the intervening years, as collusive with some "thirty-odd named respondents" including "Chase National Bank, Bender, Van Kleeck and Aumack, individually and as co-partners doing business as Bender & Co., American Express Company, General Precision Equipment Corporation, National-Simplex-Bludworth Corporation, Inc., Skouras Theatres Corporation, Randforce Amusement Corporation, Rinfriss Corporation, Samuel Rinzler, and the executors under the will of Louis Frisch." In a 1960 published opinion of the United States District Court S.D. New York, the matter was dismissed for the trustees' failing to plead the fraud in particulars; however, the record was left open for them to revitalize with evidence.

List of Fox Theatres
See the following articles for information about specific theatres.
 Amarillo, Texas-Opened 1967, closed 1992, demolished 1993
 Anaheim-Opened April 1968, 2nd and 3rd screens created fall of 1974, demolished 1998
 Atlanta—Opened 1929
 Aurora, Colorado—Opened 1946
 Aurora, Illinois—Opened 1935
 Bakersfield, California—Opened 1930
 Banning, California—Currently open with 3 screens
 Beverly Hills, California
 Wilshire-Opened September 19, 1930, closed 1977, reopened by Nederlander Theatres as the Saban 1981, currently being restored
 Billings, Montana—Opened November 13, 1931, the last Art Deco theatre in the United States built by 20th Century Fox Corporation; sold to Carsich Theatres in 1978; renovated and reopened as the Alberta Bair Theatre for the Performing Arts in 1987
 Boulder, Colorado—Opened 1926 as the Rialto Theatre
 Britt, Iowa-Now office space
 Brooklyn, New York
 Alba-Opened 1929, operation later handed over to Randforce Amusement Corporation, closed 1970, eventually demolished, site now occupied by a hospital
 Brooklyn-Opened August 31, 1928, demolished 1971, site now occupied by Con Edison
 Congress-Opened 1927, later taken over by Randforce, vacant as of 2006
 Meserole-Opened 1921, originally operated by Small & Strausburg, later taken over by Fox West Coast, then by United Artists, closed 1978, now Rite Aid
 Savoy-Opened September 1, 1926, operation taken over by Randforce Amusement Corporation 1933, eventually became Charity Neighborhood Baptist Church, demolished 2014
 Burlingame, California
 Bunkie, Louisiana-Opened 1945, closed early 1960s, now city hall
 Centralia, Washington—Opened in 1930. Closed in 1990s. Currently being restored.
 Costa Mesa, California-Opened 1968, screen divided in early 1970s, closed 2000, demolished 2008, site now occupied by a lawn
 Detroit—Largest of the Fox theatres, opened 1928, fully restored 1988
 El Paso, Texas—Opened in 1965, and was the first in Texas. Has since been demolished.
 Forest Hills, New York
 Kew Gardens-Opened September 14, 1929, later became a miniature golf course, demolished late 1950s
 Fullerton, California—Opened 1925 as the Alician Court Theatre
 Green Bay, Wisconsin—opened February 14, 1930
 Hanford, California—Opened 1929 and is currently used for live concerts, restoration is ongoing
 Hutchinson, Kansas—Opened 1931
 Inglewood, California-Opened March 31, 1949, closed mid-1980s, vacant
 Joplin, Missouri—Opened 1930, now converted to a church
 Kingsport Tennessee-Opened 1944, closed no later than 1963, was a country music recording studio into the early ’90s, now a beauty salon
 Las Cruces, New Mexico—Opened 1926, acquired by Fox in 1929, restored in 2005
 Las Vegas
 Long Beach, California-Built 1929
 Los Angeles
 Adams-Open as early as 1938, eventually closed, now a church
 Belmont-Open as early as 1926, demolished 1970s
 Bruin-Opened 1937, currently first run, and operated by Regency Theatres
 Figueroa-Opened 1925, closed/demolished late 1960s, site now occupied by a Broadway Federal Bank
 Florence-Opened 1932, closed around 1965, demolished around 1968, site now occupied by a Rite-Aid
 Gentry-Opened 1938, eventually closed, now divided into multiple retail spaces
 La Brea-Opened 1949, now a church
 Ritz-Open as early as 1930, reopened 1963 as the Lindy Opera House, demolished 1977, site now occupied by a multipurpose building
 Northridge – Opened September 11, 1963, subsequently a shoe store, and now a Goodwill thrift shop.
 Stadium-Opened 1931, now a church
 Uptown-Open as early as 1926, closed, and demolished 1965
 Westwood—Opened 1931
McCook, Nebraska - Opened January 28, 1927, now a live theater.
 Missoula, Montana-Opened December 8, 1949, demolished now
 New Orleans, Louisiana-Opened 1941, closed/demolished 1975
 Oakland, California—Opened 1928, restored in 2009
 Paso Robles, California—Opening and closing dates unknown, still standing but abandoned
 Philadelphia, Pennsylvania—Later part of Stanley Warner and Milgram Theatres chains.  Opened 1923.  Closed and demolished in 1980.
 Phoenix, Arizona
 Phoenix Opened July 30, 1931, demolished 1975
 Chris-Town-Opened 1967, 2nd screen added 1971, 3rd through 11th screens added 1996
 Pomona, California—Opened 1931
 Portland, Oregon —Opened 1911; theater demolished April 1997
 Provo, Utah-Opened 1967, closed 1986, demolished
 Redlands, California—Opened 1928
 Redwood City, California—Opened in 1929, remodeled in the 1950s, listed on National Register of Historic Places in 1993
 Riverside, California—Opened 1929, first theatre to preview Gone with the Wind; restored in 2008–2009, reopened January 2010,
 San Bernardino, California—Opened 1929
 Salina, Kansas—Opened 1932, closed 1987, given to City 1989, restored by non-profit and reopened 2003 as a performing arts center (still in use 2018..)
 Salinas, California
 Salt Lake City, Utah
 Cottonwood Mall 4-Opened July 10, 1968, screen divided into 2 December 1976, screens 3 & 4 added 1977, closed February 14, 2002, demolished late 2000s, site now vacant
 San Antonio, Texas-Opened 1969 as Fox Twin Theatres, renamed Fox Central Park 3 Theatres when screen 2 was divided in 1974, screen 1 divided 1984, closed mid 1990s, demolished 2003
 San Diego, California
 Egyptian-Opened 1923, completely remodeled 1954, closed 1997, demolished 2003
 Fairmount-Opened January 29, 1929, renamed Crest by 1950, closed 1959 and demolished shortly later
 San Diego—Opened 1929
 Valley Circle-Opened 1967, closed/demolished 1998
 San Francisco
 Parkside-Opened 1928, closed 1988, now a daycare
 San Francisco—Opened 1929, closed/demolished 1963, site now occupied by Fox Plaza (no relation to the famous Fox Plaza in Los Angeles)
 San Jose, California—Opened 1927, closed in 1973, renovated and reopened in 2004
 Santa Barbara, California—Opened 1930
 Santa Paula, California— Opened on October 12, 1950, the Fox Theatre ran through at least 1968 but was demolished in the late-1980s.
 Seattle, Washington—Opened 1929, renamed Roxy in 1933
 Spokane, Washington—Opened 1931
 Springfield, Massachusetts-Opened February 26, 1970, now a "Carpetland & More Inc" store
 Springfield, Missouri—Also originally part of the Electric Theatre chain, and also now serving as a church. Built by M.E. Gillioz, who later built the Gillioz Theatre in Springfield.
 St. Louis—Opened 1929 with a nearly identical interior to its Detroit counterpart (with about 500 fewer seats), fully restored in 1982.
 Stockton, California—Opened 1930, renamed the Bob Hope Theatre
 Toronto, Canada—Opened 1914
 Tucson, Arizona
 Buena Vista—Opened February 10, 1967, 2nd screen added in 1972, closed early 1990s, reopened 1995, closed late 1997 to early 1998, demolished 2008, site now occupied by Hampton Inn & Suites
 Lyric-Open as early as 1919, operated by Fox West Coast as early as March 19, 1949, in operation as late as May 21, 1963, since demolished, site now occupied by Pima County building
 Tucson—Opened 1930, closed 1974, reopened 2005
 22nd Street Drive-In-Opened June 2, 1954, closed and demolished 1979,
 Taft, California—Opened 1951
 Venice, California—Opened 1951, now an indoor swap meet
 Ventura, California-Opened 1969, twinned December 1982, closed late 1980s, now a Jewelry Couture
 Visalia, California—Opened 1930, reopened 1999
 Watsonville, California—Closed 2009
 Wichita, Kansas-Opened October 23, 1969

Notes

External links
 Movie Theaters Previously Operated by Fox Theatres (Cinema Treasures)

Movie palaces
Movie theatre chains in the United States